Roman Hrabaň (born 28 June 1962) is a Czech athlete. He competed in the men's decathlon at the 1988 Summer Olympics. He also competed in the two-man and the four-man bobsleigh events at the 1992 Winter Olympics.

See also
 List of athletes who competed in both the Summer and Winter Olympic games

References

1962 births
Living people
Athletes (track and field) at the 1988 Summer Olympics
Bobsledders at the 1992 Winter Olympics
Czech decathletes
Czech male bobsledders
Olympic athletes of Czechoslovakia
Olympic bobsledders of Czechoslovakia
Sportspeople from Liberec